Jim Jones & Skull Gang Present A Tribute to Bad Santa Starring Mike Epps is a Christmas-themed hip hop compilation album by American hip hop recording artist Jim Jones and American hip hop group Skull Gang. The album was released on November 25, 2008, by Koch Records and Splash. The album features guest appearances from members of Dipset and ByrdGang, respectively.

Background 
In February 2009, Deonta Cummings filed a lawsuit against Jim Jones and E1 Records (formerly Koch) alleging that his artist, Ivory Keys, was not given proper compensation or credit for his contribution to the album .

Track listing

References

Jim Jones (rapper) albums
Collaborative albums
Albums produced by Maejor
2008 Christmas albums
Christmas albums by American artists
2008 albums
Hip hop albums by American artists
E1 Music albums